is a Japanese manga artist. She debuted professionally in 2009, producing yaoi manga for various magazines. Her 2010 series, Kimi Note, became her first breakthrough hit. In 2013, Junko released her first shōjo series Kiss Him, Not Me, which won Best Shōjo Manga at the 40th Kodansha Manga Awards.

Career

Junko grew up reading yaoi manga and also drew yaoi fan art. She debuted professionally in 2009, creating manga for various yaoi magazines, and in 2010, Kimi Note became her first breakthrough hit. A staff member from Bessatsu Friend invited her to work on a series for their magazine after reading her works. After deciding on an otome game concept with, under Eiki Eiki's suggestion, jokes about the fujoshi culture, Junko created Kiss Him, Not Me. Kiss Him, Not Me was critically acclaimed, winning Best Shōjo Manga at the 40th Kodansha Manga Awards and surveyed as one of the best shōjo series in Kono Manga ga Sugoi! in 2015. After she ended the series in 2019, she began publishing Star-Crossed!! in Bessatsu Friend.

Works

Series

References

External links
 

Living people
Year of birth missing (living people)
Manga artists from Kanagawa Prefecture
Women manga artists
Japanese female comics artists
Female comics writers
Japanese women writers